was a Japanese journalist and political critic.

Life
He was born in Hyogo Prefecture. Having graduated from the Department of Law of Tokyo University, he joined the East-Asiatic Commercial Intelligence Institute at Tokyo of the South Manchuria Railway. (The name of this institute was changed to the East Asiatic Economic Investigation Bureau.)  Later he joined the Asahi Shimbun and in 1945, he became head the editorial board and wrote essays in Tensei Jingo. In 1947, he headed the Department of Publication of Asahi Shimbun. Later he became Instructor at Dokkyo University, and a member of the Ministry of Education's University educational accreditation committee and a member of other public committees.

His Books
Revisionism of Eduard Bernstein translation, Shueikaku, 1920
Karl Marx and Friedrich Engels. co-authored by Nobuo Goto,  Kohbundo Shobo 1925
Modern Russian History Study.  Dojinsha, 1925
Asian Problems.  Toen Shobo, 1939
A Study of Asia.  Orion Sha, 1940
Soviet Economy since its establishment to today. Seibundo Shinkosha, 1941
Nansoki. Shorinsha, 1942
Those who contributed to history. Ooyashu Shuppan, 1948
Social Problems in Meiji Era. Keiyusha, 1955
Nakae Chomin. Kokudosha, 1956
Ogata Taketora. Jiji Tsushinsha, 1962
20 Postwar Years of Okinawa. Jijitsushinsha, 1966
Jinbutsu Mangekyo. Asahi Shimbun, 1967
Okinawa Taiwan Diary. Jijitsushinsha, 1968
5 Distinguished Journalists - Nakae Chomin, Taguchi Ukichi, Miyake Setsurei, Hasegawa Nyozekan, Ogata Taketora. Asahi Shimbun, 1973

References

Japanese journalists
The Asahi Shimbun people
1896 births
1978 deaths
20th-century journalists